Austin Roberts may refer to:

Austin Roberts (American football) (born 1995), American football tight end
Austin Roberts (singer) (born 1945), American singer and songwriter
Austin Roberts (zoologist) (1883–1948), South African zoologist

See also
 
 Austin Robertson (disambiguation)